Shannan Ponton is a personal trainer on the Australian version of The Biggest Loser. He made his first appearance during the show's second season in 2007, where he trained the blue team alongside Bob Harper. After Harper's departure during the second week of training, Ponton was left as the official trainer of the blue team, and he continued his role as the blue team's trainer during the show's third season in 2008.
He has been the blue teams trainer for a total of 10 seasons as he continues in The Biggest Loser Australia 2016: Transformed. He attended Muirfield High School in North Rocks, New South Wales.

In 2020, Ponton participated in the Seven Network's reality program SAS Australia.

References

Sources
 Shannan Ponton – photo gallery
 Shannan Ponton and Kylie Stray going strong in Bali – relationship with Kylie Stray
 
 Shannan Ponton – mbf

External links
 Shannan Ponton's trainer profile

1973 births
Living people
Australian exercise and fitness writers
Australian exercise instructors
Australian health and wellness writers
Writers from Sydney